Central Eleuthera is one of the districts of the Bahamas, on the island of Eleuthera.

Districts of the Bahamas
Eleuthera